Nicolas Robert (18 April 1614 – 25 March 1685) was a French miniaturist and engraver. He was born in Langres and died in Paris.

In 1664 he was appointed as "peintre ordinaire de Sa Majesté pur la miniature" (Painter of Miniatures) to Louis XIV.

Works

Blunt highlights Robert's main works as follows:
 Illustrations within the book - Guirlande de Julie - which was produced by Nicolas Jarry as a gift for Julie Lucine d'Angennes from her future husband the Duke of Montausier. It was this work that made Robert famous and drew the attention of Gaston, Duke of Orléans.
Paintings of flowers on vellum for Gaston and latterly for Louis XIV that form the nucleus of the Recueil des vélins currently held in the Muséum national d'histoire naturelle within the Jardin des Plantes.
Contributions to the Recueil des Plantes - a collection of engravings of flowers. Prints from these were published in the two-volume work - Estampes de Plantes and in Mémoires pour servir á l'Histoire des Plantes

Other works include:
Fiori Diversi - a small book of etchings of flowers published in Rome on 1640.
Diverses Fleurs c 1660
Sketchbooks A & B, in the Austrian National Library, detailed in H.Walter Lack's Garden of Eden (Taschen: 2008)
Livre des Tulipes, in the Austrian National Library, detailed in H.Walter Lack's Garden of Eden (Taschen: 2008)

Colleagues
Robert worked with the following people:
 Robert Morison a Scottish botanist by whom it is believed that Robert was first prompted to take an interest in scientific botanic illustration.
Denis Dodart
Abraham Bosse
Louis de Chastillon

References
Wilfred Blunt, Chapter 9 of The Art of Botanical Illustration, Collins, London, 1950.
Artfact
ILAB

1614 births
1685 deaths
People from Langres
17th-century engravers
17th-century French painters
French male painters
French engravers